Kjartan Sturluson (born 27 December 1975) is a retired Icelandic international football goalkeeper.

References

1975 births
Living people
Association football goalkeepers
Kjartan Sturluson
Kjartan Sturluson
Kjartan Sturluson
Kjartan Sturluson
Kjartan Sturluson